Hazeltine may refer to:

People
 Abner Hazeltine (1793–1879), American politician
 Alice Isabel Hazeltine (1878–1959), American librarian, editor, and writer
 David Hazeltine (born 1958), American jazz pianist, composer, arranger and educator
 Deliverance Dane (died 1735), née Hazeltine, convicted in the Salem Witch Trials
 Harold Dexter Hazeltine (1871–1960), American legal scholar
 Mary E. Hazeltine (1868–1949), American librarian
 Matt Hazeltine (1933–1987), American football player
 Ira Sherwin Hazeltine (1821–1899), American politician
 Louis Alan Hazeltine (1886–1964), American engineer and physicist, developer of the Neutrodyne receiver
 Martin Mason Hazeltine (1827-1903), American photographer

Other uses
 Hazeltine Corporation, the company which marketed the Neutrodyne and other electronic equipment
 Hazeltine Lake, Minnesota
 Hazeltine National Golf Club, Chaska, Minnesota
 Hazeltine Park, Portland, Oregon

See also
 Hazeldine (disambiguation)